Targon is a commune in the Gironde department in Nouvelle-Aquitaine in southwestern France.

Population

Sights and monuments
 Église Saint-Romain de Targon, 12th century Romanesque church, listed as a monument historique since 1925.
 Église de Montarouch, 13th century Romanesque church, once the property of the Knights Hospitaller, now in ruins, listed as a monument historique since 1925.

See also
Communes of the Gironde department

References

Communes of Gironde